Hajji Ahmad Kandi (also Romanized as Ḩājjī Aḩmad Kandī and Ḩājī Aḩmad Kandī) is a village in Hajjilar-e Jonubi Rural District, Hajjilar District, Chaypareh County, West Azerbaijan Province, Iran. At the 2006 census, its population was 345, in 75 families.

References 

Populated places in Chaypareh County